The successful Landing on Groß Stresow by Prussian, Danish and Saxon troops took place on 15 November 1715 on the island of Rügen, Germany during the Great Northern War.
The landing was followed with cavalry assaults from the Swedish defences on the island, commanded by Charles XII king of Sweden who despite the huge numerical disadvantage of - one up against five - chose to attack the fortified camp. The Swedes managed to get past the "Cheval de frise" and break through, but were then rapidly repulsed and routed after taking heavy casualties.

The battle had lasted for almost an hour and Charles, who got his horse shot dead under him during the fight, later said: "Is there no god beside me?". The attack was supposed to work like a needle-manoeuvre "concentrate the full attack at one point, break through and then destroy the defences from the inside" used by the Swedes fifteen years earlier in the battle of Narva, where they were greatly successful and victorious.

About five hundred Swedes were either dead or wounded along with all their artillery captured. The allied casualties were: 43 dead and 121 wounded Danes 36 Saxons and 49 Prussians dead or wounded. This was, however, probably the first notable Swedish field-battle defeat led directly by Charles XII. With the landing secured the alliance continued fighting off the last remaining Swedes on the island of Rügen and later joined up with the troops laying siege to Stralsund.

See also
 Nils Krister von Baumgarten gave his horse to Charles XII who had suffered a bullet wound to his chest which allowed the Swedish king to get away after his previous horse got shot and killed. Baumgarten was later appointed Colonel of "Adelsfanan" by Charles.

References

Footnotes

Citations

 Battle of Stresow, Poul Ib Liebe

Groß Stresow
Stresow
Stralsund 1715
Stralsund 1715
Stralsund 1715
Rügen
Stresow